"2300 Jackson Street" is a 1989 single released by the Jacksons from their album of the same name. It is the only song on the album featuring Michael and Marlon Jackson, as they had left the group before further recording sessions. The song also features two of the Jackson sisters: Rebbie and Janet. "2300 Jackson Street" is about the Jackson family's childhood home on 2300 Jackson Street in Gary, Indiana.

Music video
The music video was directed by Greg Gold and produced by Phil Rose. The video features most of the Jackson family members. La Toya is not featured in the music video nor the song, as she was estranged from the family at the time. Marlon, while he sang on the track, also did not appear in the video. Some scenes include the Jackson family playing pool and Jermaine, Tito, Randy and Jackie playing football. It also shows some members of the Jackson family singing the song together. The video was shot in March 1989 in Hayvenhurst, Encino, Los Angeles.

Featured in the video
Austin Brown
Autumn Joy Jackson
Brandi Jackson
Jaimy Jackson
Jackie Jackson
Janet Jackson
Jeremy Maldonaldo Jackson
Jermaine Jackson, Jr.
Joe Jackson
Jermaine Jackson
Katherine Jackson
Michael Jackson
Randy Jackson
Rebbie Jackson
Sigmund Esco Jackson, Jr.
Stacee Brown
T. J. Jackson
Tito Jackson
Taj Jackson
Taryll Jackson
Yashi Brown

Charts

References

External links

1989 singles
The Jackson 5 songs
Michael Jackson songs
Janet Jackson songs
Epic Records singles
1989 songs
Songs written by Jermaine Jackson
Songs written by Jackie Jackson
Songs written by Tito Jackson
Song recordings produced by Teddy Riley